Philip John Williams (b. 1897–1981) — also known as Philip J. Williams (Φίλιππος Αθανασούλιας) of Detroit, Wayne County, Mich. First Greek-American Lawyer in Detroit. Married to Penelope Pappan (Παπαστοθοπούλου), a descendant of Theodoros Kolokotronis, in 1941. 
Born in Kastrion, Arcadia, Greece, February 17, 1897. Member of the Michigan State House of Representatives from Wayne County 1st District. Also member of the Freemasons and Oddfellows clubs.

References 

20th-century American lawyers
Lawyers from Detroit
1897 births
1981 deaths
19th-century Greek Americans
Greek emigrants to the United States